Swan Lake, is a small lake located in the center of the town of Sitka, Alaska.  It is a man-made lake, created during the Russian occupation of Alaska as an income source during the winter.  Russians would export ice to southern communities in the Pacific Northwest.

Swan Lake contains rainbow trout, cutthroat trout and dolly varden. There is a small dock to fish from located on the east side of the lake.

Notes

Reservoirs in Alaska
Lakes of Sitka, Alaska